2009–2010 Vale Inco strike was a labour dispute in Port Colborne, Ontario and Sudbury, Ontario which lasted from July 13, 2009 to July 8, 2010. Striking workers were part of United Steel Workers Local 6500. It was the longest strike in Canadian history, surpassing the 1978 Inco strike.

See also

 Timeline of labour in Greater Sudbury
 Economy of Greater Sudbury

References 

2009 labor disputes and strikes
2010 labor disputes and strikes
History of Greater Sudbury
Economy of Greater Sudbury
2009 in Ontario
2010 in Ontario
Labour disputes in Ontario
Miners' labour disputes in Canada
Labor disputes led by the United Steelworkers